Girolline is a marine sponge isolate that inhibits protein synthesis.

External links
 Unbiased Screening of Marine Sponge Extracts for Anti-inflammatory Agents Combined with Chemical Genomics Identifies Girolline as an Inhibitor of Protein Synthesis

Protein synthesis inhibitor antibiotics
Imidazoles
Amines
Organochlorides